Jonathan "Jonny" Tennenbaum (born 1 September 1979) is an Argentine-Israeli professional association football player currently contracted to Hapoel F.C. Sandala Gilboa.

Playing career 
Tennenbaum arrived in Israel as part of the Argentine football team for the Maccabiah Games. Afterward one season with Hakoah Ramat Gan, he signed with Hapoel Ashkelon and played alongside fellow Argentine, Carlos Chacana.

After a successful time with Ashkelon, Tennenbaum made a stop with Maccabi Kiryat Ata before landing with Hapoel Ra'anana. The Argentine became a fixture in the Ra'anana line-up. In his last season with the club, Tennenbaum scored the crucial goal that promoted them to the Israeli Premier League and was named player of the week. Tennenbaum left Ra'anana after the season for Hapoel Acre.

Statistics

Honours
Liga Artzit (1):
2004–05
Liga Alef (North) (1):
2012-13

Footnotes

External links 
 
 Profile on BDFA.com.ar 

1979 births
Living people
Jewish Argentine sportspeople
Jewish Israeli sportspeople
Maccabiah Games competitors for Argentina
Argentine emigrants to Israel
Israeli footballers
Hakoah Maccabi Ramat Gan F.C. players
Hapoel Ashkelon F.C. players
Maccabi Ironi Kiryat Ata F.C. players
Hapoel Ra'anana A.F.C. players
Hapoel Acre F.C. players
Hapoel Afula F.C. players
Israeli Premier League players
Liga Leumit players
Israeli people of Argentine-Jewish descent
Sportspeople of Argentine descent
Place of birth missing (living people)
Maccabiah Games footballers
Association football defenders